Blerim Gjonpalaj, better known by his pen name Bleri Lleshi is an Albanian philosopher and public speaker . He is an activist, dj, and author based in Brussels. His research focuses on topics such as inequality, neoliberalism, youth, migration, identities, and extremism.

Lleshi was born in 1981 in Albania. He writes for various Belgian media such as De Morgen and MO*, but also English ones such as EUObserver and The Brussels Times.

Lleshi has participated in conferences, debates, and media such as Euronews, BBC, Channel4, etc. In 2014, he was considered as one of the most influential immigrants in Belgium. In December 2018 he was named ambassador of peace for 2018 by Pax Christi. Lleshi is lecturer at UCLL in Leuven.

Artistic project as DJ Bruselo 
Lleshi has also an artistic project as a DJ. His artist name is Bruselo (pr. brusé:lo), Esperanto for Brussels. As DJ he plays recorded music from all over the world such as Balkanic, cumbia, afrobeat, soukous, arabesque, to hip hop, dancehall, and reggae. He is also the organizer and resident DJ of Globalicious, a monthly event in Brussels with concerts, international guests, dance workshops and dj's.

Publications 
 De kracht van hoop, EPO, 2018
 Inaya. Brief aan mijn kind, EPO, 2017
 Lleshi, Bleri., Liefde in tijden van angst, EPO, 2016,
De neoliberale strafstaat (The neoliberal penal state), EPO, 2014. .
Brieven uit Brussel / Lettres de Bruxelles · Jongeren aan het woord / Les jeunes prennent la parole (Letters of Brussels · Youth is Speaking), as editor, EPO, 2013. .
Identiteit en interculturaliteit. Identiteitsconstructie bij jongeren in Brussel (Identity and multiculturalism. Identity construction among young people in Brussels), Vubpress 2010, as co-author with Marc Van den Bosche. .

References

Date of birth missing (living people)
1981 births
Living people
21st-century Belgian philosophers
Belgian male writers
Belgian people of Albanian descent